Gildersome is a civil parish in the metropolitan borough of the City of Leeds, West Yorkshire, England.  The parish contains eight listed buildings that are recorded in the National Heritage List for England. All the listed buildings are designated at Grade II, the lowest of the three grades, which is applied to "buildings of national importance and special interest".  The parish contains the village of Gildersome and the surrounding area, and the listed buildings consist of houses, a church and Sunday school, a Friend's meeting house, and a milestone.


Buildings

References

Citations

Sources

 

Lists of listed buildings in West Yorkshire